The AQM-60 Kingfisher, originally designated XQ-5, was a target drone version of the USAF's X-7 ramjet test aircraft built by the Lockheed Corporation. The aircraft was designed by Kelly Johnson, who later created the Lockheed A-12 and its relatives, such as the Lockheed SR-71 Blackbird and Lockheed YF-12.

The X-7's development began in 1946 after a request from the USAF for a Mach 3 unmanned aerial vehicle for test purposes.  This craft evolved into the Kingfisher, which was later used to test anti-missile systems such as the MIM-3 Nike Ajax, SAM-A-25/MIM-14 Nike Hercules, and IM-99/CIM-10.

The Kingfisher was capable of evading the vast majority of weapons systems it was used to test, despite the systems being designed to destroy hypersonic missiles in flight. This created much embarrassment at the USAF and considerable political fallout. This led to the discontinuation of production in 1959 and the cancellation of the project in the mid-1960s.

The engine developed for the AQM-60 was later modified for use on the long range nuclear armed  CIM-10 Bomarc, which was a nationwide defense against nuclear bombers during the 1960s and early 1970s. An endurance variant of the same engine was produced for use in the Lockheed D-21, which was launched from the back of a Lockheed SR-71 Blackbird mothership or from under the wing of a Boeing B-52 Stratofortress nuclear bomber.

Specifications

References

External links

 Directory of US Military Rockets and Missiles
 http://www.designation-systems.net/dusrm/m-60.html

AQM-060
1950s United States special-purpose aircraft
Target drones of the United States
Single-engined jet aircraft
Ramjet-powered aircraft
Aircraft with auxiliary rocket engines
Mid-wing aircraft
Aircraft first flown in 1951
Cruciform tail aircraft